Running Down the Road is the second studio album by American folk singer Arlo Guthrie. Guthrie's version of the traditional folk tune "Stealin'" was featured in the film Two-Lane Blacktop. The cover shows the artist upon a Triumph TR6 Trophy motorcycle which is also pictured in the album's 'gate'.

Track listing
All tracks composed by Arlo Guthrie; except where noted. "Coming into Los Angeles" is the first song on side-B of the original album.

Personnel
Arlo Guthrie - vocals, guitar, piano
Clarence White - guitar
Ry Cooder - guitar, mandolin, bass
Gene Parsons - drums, guitar, harmonica
James Burton - guitar
Chris Ethridge - bass
Milt Holland - percussion
Jerry Scheff - bass
John Pilla - guitar
Jim Gordon - drums
Technical
Barry Feldman - executive producer
Doug Botnick - engineer
Henry Diltz - cover photography

References

Arlo Guthrie albums
1969 albums
Albums produced by Lenny Waronker
E1 Music albums
Rising Son Records albums
Reprise Records albums
Albums produced by Van Dyke Parks